David (Davyd) Ivanovich Orlov (6 July 1840 – 24 August 1916) was an Imperial Russian lieutenant general and division commander. His son Ivan (1870–1918) married Elena de Struve, daughter of Karl von Struve. His daughter Varvara Davydovna (1870–1915) married the son of Illarion Ivanovich Vorontsov-Dashkov.

Awards
Order of Saint Anna, 4th class, 1863
Order of Saint Anna, 3rd class, 1866
Order of Saint Stanislaus (House of Romanov), 2nd class, 1869
Order of Saint Anna, 2nd class, 1872
Order of Saint Vladimir, 3rd class, 1877
Gold Sword for Bravery, 1877
Order of Saint Stanislaus (House of Romanov), 1881
Order of Saint Anna, 1st class, 1883
Order of Saint Vladimir, 2nd class, 1885
Order of the White Eagle (Russian Empire), 1897

Sources
 Милорадович Г. А. Список лиц свиты их величеств с царствования императора Петра I по 1886 год. Чернигов, 1886, с.88.
 Список генералам по старшинству. Составлен по 1 мая 1901. СПб., с.205.
 Список генералам по старшинству. Часть I, II и III. Составлен по 1-е января 1910. СПб., 1910, с. 114.
 Д. И. Орлов

1840 births
1916 deaths
Russian people of the January Uprising
Russian military personnel of the Russo-Turkish War (1877–1878)
Recipients of the Order of St. Anna, 4th class
Recipients of the Order of St. Anna, 3rd class
Recipients of the Order of Saint Stanislaus (Russian), 2nd class
Recipients of the Order of St. Anna, 2nd class
Recipients of the Order of St. Vladimir, 3rd class
Recipients of the Gold Sword for Bravery
Recipients of the Order of Saint Stanislaus (Russian), 1st class
Recipients of the Order of St. Anna, 1st class
Recipients of the Order of St. Vladimir, 2nd class
Recipients of the Order of the White Eagle (Russia)